Portzamparc is a surname. Notable people with the surname include: 

Christian de Portzamparc (born 1944), French architect
Elizabeth de Portzamparc,  French-Brazilian architect